The Egypt Game (1967) is a Newbery Honor-winning novel by Zilpha Keatley Snyder. Set in a small college town in California, the novel follows the creation of a sustained imaginative game by a group of six children.

Summary
April Hall, the daughter of an up-and-coming film actress, is sent to live with her grandmother in an old apartment house in Berkeley, California. She feels abandoned and masks her grief with truculent sarcasm and Hollywood mannerisms. Her grandmother arranges for her to meet neighbor children Melanie and Marshall Ross, and they bond over "imagining games" and a shared interest in archaeology. April also investigates a nearby antique shop run by a mysterious and somewhat spooky old man known as The Professor. In the shop's storage yard, the girls discover a replica of the famous bust of Nefertiti, leading them to create a sustained imaginary game about Ancient Egypt.

Legacies 
Snyder followed up on the plot possibility hinted at in the end of the book by writing The Gypsy Game in 1997, which follows up directly on the characters and story of The Egypt Game.

Gaming scholar Cathlena Martin demonstrated how Snyder's book preceded and laid the ground for the role-playing gameplay designs of Dungeons & Dragons (1974), in "involving a player’s immersion in world building, collaboration, and role playing."

Reception 
A cautionary summary in the Kirkus Reviews in 1967 notes that the book has both “all the elements for ten, eleven-year-old enjoyment” but also the murder of a child in which “the demented killer is both tangential to the plot and a questionable component in a book for this age.” The Bulletin of the Center for Children’s Books, however, said the book “is strong in characterization, the dialogue is superb, the plot is original.” In 2013, National Public Radio included The Egypt Game in its list of "100 Must-Reads for Kids 9-14."

In 1970, the novel was named as a Lewis Carroll Shelf Award, an American literary award conferred on books annually by the University of Wisconsin–Madison School of Education. 

In 1973 it received the George C. Stone Recognition of Merit award, given by Bookology, a magazine of children's literature.

References

External links

 Random House review

1967 American novels
American children's novels
Newbery Honor-winning works
Novels set in California
1967 children's books
Ancient Egypt in popular culture
Novels by Zilpha Keatley Snyder